Dacryobolus is a genus of crust fungi in the family Fomitopsidaceae. Elias Fries circumscribed the genus in 1849 with Dacryobolus sudans (then known as Hydnum sudans Alb. & Schwein.) as the type species. Dacryobolus are wood-decay fungi that cause a brown rot.

Species
Dacryobolus costratus (Rehill & B.K.Bakshi) S.S.Rattan (1977) – Asia
Dacryobolus gracilis H.S.Yuan (2016) – China
Dacryobolus incarnatus Quél. (1885)
Dacryobolus karstenii (Bres.) Oberw. ex Parmasto (1968) – Europe
Dacryobolus montanus X.Z.Wan & H.S.Yuan (2016) – China
Dacryobolus phalloides Manjón, Hjortstam & G.Moreno (1984) – Spain
Dacryobolus sudans  (Alb. & Schwein.) Fr. (1849) – Europe

References

Fomitopsidaceae
Polyporales genera
Taxa named by Elias Magnus Fries
Taxa described in 1849